Tapen Chatterjee (3 September 1937 – 24 May 2010) was a Bengali actor from India who played several roles in Satyajit Ray's films, notably as Goopy Gyne in Goopy Gyne Bagha Byne (1968), and its sequels Heerak Rajar Deshe (1980) and Goopy Bagha Phire Elo (1992). Chatterjee died on 24 May 2010 at the age of 72. He was suffering from pulmonary ailments.

Career
As a qualified engineer, Chatterjee had a job in Rajasthan, following which he came back to Kolkata and joined Sandesh, the Bengali magazine revived by Satyajit Ray. He started his career in the advertisement department of the children's magazine Sandesh. Ray cast him in a cameo in Mahanagar and then famously as the singer Goopy Gyne in Goopy Gyne Bagha Byne. The song Aaha Ki Aananda Aakshe Batashe filmed on him Goopy and Rabi Ghosh as Bagha Byne still stirs the memory of the Bengali film lovers.

Filmography

References

External links

 Satyajit Ray's Goopy is no more

1937 births
2010 deaths
Bengali male actors
Deaths from lung disease
Indian male film actors
Male actors in Bengali cinema
Male actors from Kolkata